Cruisin' Down the River is a 1953 American Technicolor musical film directed by Richard Quine. It stars Dick Haymes and Audrey Totter. The story is about a New York nightclub singer who inherits an old riverboat on the Chattahoochee River between Georgia and Alabama. It features comedy, some drama and several musical performances.

Plot summary
Beau Clemment, a singer in New York City, learns that he has inherited a riverboat once owned by his grandfather, Beauregard, who had won it from its captain, Thaddeus Jackson, in a game of chance. Jackson has been bitter ever since, his old acquaintance Humphrey Hepburn recalling how Beauregard also won the heart of the vessel's star performer, Melissa Curry.

Beau travels to Alabama to claim the boat, which he finds in something far less than ship-shape condition. Unsure whether to scrap it or sell what's left of it, Beau meets singer Sally Jane Jackson, granddaughter of Thaddeus, and they develop a mutual attraction. He elects to restore the vessel and launch it with entertainment and gambling. He even recruits Thaddeus's singing butler, William, to perform aboard ship.

Thaddeus objects to his ownership and presence, doing everything in his power to scuttle the venture. By the time the law catches up to it, Beau's boat has sailed into Georgia, out of its jurisdiction. Thaddeus, finally accepting the situation, is given a 50-50 interest in the boat with Beau, who is about to wed Sally Jane and become a part of the family.

Cast

References

External links
 
 
 
 
 

1953 films
Films directed by Richard Quine
1950s English-language films
1950s romantic musical films
American romantic musical films
1950s American films